Sharpshooters is a 1938 American adventure film directed by James Tinling and written by Robert Ellis and Helen Logan. The film stars Brian Donlevy, Lynn Bari, Wally Vernon, John 'Dusty' King, Douglass Dumbrille and C. Henry Gordon. The film was released on November 15, 1938, by 20th Century Fox.

Plot
Cameraman Steve Mitchell and his partner Waldo go to a mythical kingdom in Europe where three villains are plotting to take out the Prince, the villains think Steve is on their side when they hear him speak about "shooting" the coronation.

Cast     
Brian Donlevy as Steve Mitchell
Lynn Bari as Dianne Woodward
Wally Vernon as Waldo
John 'Dusty' King as Prince Alexis 
Douglass Dumbrille as Count Maxim
C. Henry Gordon as Kolter
Sidney Blackmer as Baron Orloff
Martin Spellman as Prince Michael Martin
Frank Puglia as Ivan
Hamilton MacFadden as Bowman
Romaine Callender as Consul's Assistant

References

External links
 

1938 films
20th Century Fox films
American adventure films
1938 adventure films
Films directed by James Tinling
American black-and-white films
Films set in Europe
Films about journalists
1930s English-language films
1930s American films
Films with screenplays by Maurice Rapf
English-language adventure films